Kokir may refer to:

 Kokir, Ethiopia
 Kokir, Cambodia